Krantidhra is an Oriya film based on 'Jhada Pare Surya' written by Iti Samanta and directed by Himansu Sekhar Khatua
. The main star cast of the film includes Samaresh Routray, Gargi Mohanty & Debasis Patra. The film is produced by Iti Rani Samanta.

Plot

The story is based on women empowerment, the role of women in politics & society and it shows dominance of husband over wife in Indian society . The dilemma, the struggles a woman faces in her lifetime even after giving up everything for her husband & for being on the right side of humanity.

Cast

 Gargi Mohanty ... as Pratigyan
 Samaresh Routray .... as Abhay
 Debashis Parta ... as Babu Swain
 Biduprava Pattnaik ... as Ranga Bou
 Priya Mishra ... as Father-in-law
 Bijaylaxmi Praharaj ... as Mother-in-law
 Asutosh Pattnaik ... as Bablu

Awards
Krantidhara went on to win several awards at the 2014 Odisha State Film Awards, including the Best feature film of the year prize.

 Odisha State Film Awards
 Best Film of the year 2014
 Best Actress - Gargi Mahanty
 Best Story - Iti Samanta

References

External links 
 

2010s Odia-language films